Amir M. Mokri (born June 11, 1956) is an Iranian-American cinematographer.

He is known for his work on blockbuster action films such films as Bad Boys II, Fast & Furious, Man of Steel and Transformers: Age of Extinction.

He had collaborations with directors like Michael Bay, Justin Lin, and Zack Snyder.

Mokri was born in Iran and emigrated to the United States in 1977.

Filmography

See also
Iranian cinema
Iranian cinematographers

References

External links

1956 births
AFI Conservatory alumni
Emerson College alumni
Iranian cinematographers
Living people
Iranian emigrants to the United States
Iranian diaspora film people